Sixteen members of the International Cricket Council (ICC) fielded teams at the 2000 Under-19 Cricket World Cup in Sri Lanka. Some information about squad members (including playing styles, dates of births, and even full names) is unavailable, especially for ICC associate members.

Group A

Americas

Coach:  Ron Dipchand

Source: ESPNcricinfo

England

Manager:  James Whitaker

Source: ESPNcricinfo

West Indies

Coach:  Gus Logie

Source: ESPNcricinfo

Zimbabwe

Coach:  Andy Waller

Source: ESPNcricinfo

Group B

Bangladesh

Coach:  Dipu Roy Chowdhury

Source: ESPNcricinfo

India
India's squad was announced on 3 January 2000.

Coach:  Roger Binny

                                       

Source: ESPNcricinfo

Netherlands

Source: ESPNcricinfo

New Zealand

Coach:  Dayle Hadlee

Source: ESPNcricinfo

Group C

Kenya

Coach:  Bob Dieckmann

Source: ESPNcricinfo

Nepal

Coach:  Arun Aryal

Source: ESPNcricinfo

Pakistan

Source: ESPNcricinfo

South Africa

Coach:  Anton Ferreira

Source: ESPNcricinfo

Group D

Australia

Coach:  Rod Marsh

Source: ESPNcricinfo

Ireland

Source: ESPNcricinfo

Namibia

Coach:  Tiger Lance

Source: ESPNcricinfo

Sri Lanka

Source: ESPNcricinfo

Sources
 ICC Under-19 World Cup 1999/00 – CricketArchive
 Under-19 World Cup 2000 Squads – ESPNcricinfo

References

ICC Under-19 Cricket World Cup squads
2000 ICC Under-19 Cricket World Cup